Alberto "Baby" Arizmendi (March 17, 1914 – December 31, 1962) was a Mexican professional boxer and New York State Athletic Commission (NYSAC) featherweight world title holder in 1934. He also competed in the bantamweight and welterweight divisions.

Early life and career
Arizmendi was born on March 17, 1913, in Tamaulipas, Mexico. He took up boxing as early as seven or eight by some accounts to counter the effects of Polio which he had suffered from as a young child.

Baby used a charging, bruising style, making him a very strong two-fisted fighter. He began boxing professionally at age 13.  He took his first championship, the Mexican bantamweight title at only eighteen, a twelve round points decision against Kid Poncho in Mexico City.   With a victory over flyweight champion Fidel LaBarba, Baby established himself as a worthy contender for the featherweight crown.

On September 16, 1932, at the age of 19, he defeated reigning NBA world featherweight champion Tommy Paul in a close ten round non-title fight, dropping him in the second and fourth rounds.  After his win, Arizmendi requested the National Boxing Association (NBA) recognize his status as champion. In support of his claim to the NBA title, the California boxing commission gave him the opportunity to fight for their version of the world title.

Taking and defending the California world featherweight title, October, 1932
The following month, Arizmendi defeated Newsboy Brown to claim the California world featherweight title on October 18, 1932. The Associated Press wrote that Brown won only one round and was on the verge of being knocked out several times before the Los Angeles crowd of 7,000.  Arizmendi nearly toppled Brown with a left hook in the third, but slowed his pace some in the fourth through seventh when Brown countered with short lefts, and rights to the body.

He retained his title with a draw against Varias Milling, then defended it against seasoned contenders Archie Bell and Speedy Dado. He first defeated Bell in  ten round points decision at Legion Stadium in Hollywood on December 2, 1932.  The California sanctioned title match before a capacity crowd saw Arizmendi close strongly in the last two rounds to take a convincing lead on points.  Arizmendi was awarded six rounds, Bell two including the eighth when he landed some solid punches, and two were even.  Bell was down for a no count in the second, and was dropped to his knees in the fourth.
 
In his January 6, 1933, California sanctioned World featherweight title rematch with Bell in San Francisco, Arizmendi won in a ten round points decision.  Arizmendi opened up in the sixth, and rained a steady blow of punches in the remaining rounds to take a clear points margin.  Bell may have held an edge in the first five rounds, with the exception of the third.  He withstood the blows of Arizmendi in the final rounds and remained on his feet throughout.    

In his last successful defense of the California-sanctioned world featherweight champion, Arizmendi defeated Speedy Dado in a ten round points decision in Los Angeles on January 24, 1933.

Losing the California sanctioned world featherweight title, February, 1933
He lost the California version of the title to NBA World featherweight champion Freddie Miller on February 28, 1933, in a 10-round unification bout in Los Angeles. Miller took seven rounds, with one even, and two to Arizmendi.  With a lightning right jab that landed repeatedly and a good left hook, Miller kept the Mexican champion at bay.  Arizmendi performed best in the seventh where he rushed Miller to the ropes and bloodied his nose with hard rights to head and chin.  The packed house containing many former Mexican fans, turned against Arizmendi, booing him and throwing bottles into the ring at the close of the match.

Arizmendi persevered, and later that year defeated Miller in a non-title fight.

Taking the NYSAC world featherweight crown, August, 1934
On August 30, 1934, he defeated Mike Belloise for the New York state (NYSAC) world featherweight crown, leaving no doubt as to his claim to the championship.  After the win, Arizmendi attempted to secure a third fight with NBA champion Miller in a title bout, however, Miller refused to face him.  Arizmendi's failure to take the NBA version of the featherweight title affected his legacy, despite his taking both the New York State Athletic Commission (NYSAC), and Mexico-California version of the world featherweight titles in his career.

In Mexico City on November 4, 1934, he defeated Henry Armstrong in their first of five meetings, winning almost every round despite suffering a broken wrist in the second, and by some accounts taking claim of the California-Mexican World featherweight title. He defeated Armstrong once again on January 1, 1935, in a twelve round unanimous decision in Mexico City.  Following those victories, he defeated future world title holder Chalky Wright by fourth round knockout.   On February 7, 1936, he lost to future lightweight champion Lou Ambers in a ten round unanimous decision, with Ambers taking every round, by one account.  Arizmendi, however fought well for the first five rounds, but was unable to continue the pace in the remaining portion of the match.  Ambers got his range with his punishing left in the fourth, fifth, and sixth.  In the eighth, Arizmendi suffered a bleeding cut near his right eye, helping Ambers to increase his points margin in the final two rounds.  The bout was not billed as a title fight.

Losing the California-Mexico sanctioned featherweight title, August, 1936
Arizmendi subsequently lost the California-Mexico World title in his third bout with Armstrong on August 4, 1936, at Wrigley Field in Los Angeles. In his following 7 fights, Arizmendi combined wins and losses before facing Armstrong for a fourth and final time on March 15, 1938, in Los Angeles. Despite losing the ten round fight on points, Arizmendi ended Armstrong's 27 fight knockout streak by going the distance with him. In his following 6 fights, Arizmendi won five and had a ten round draw against reigning world lightweight champion Lou Ambers on June 7, 1938, in Los Angeles.

Attempt at the world welterweight crown, January 1939
In his last bout with Armstrong and his last attempt at a world title, he dropped a grueling 10-round points decision before 10,500 fans for the world welterweight championship on January 10, 1939, at Los Angeles' Olympic Stadium.  The match was ten rounds of continuous and largely close in fighting, and though admitting he put up a valiant effort, the Los Angeles Times could only award the fourth round to the badly bruised and bleeding Arizmendi.  Armstrong characteristically crowded and threw continuous blows which included some fouls, but typical of his style, demonstrated neither elegant technique, nor graceful ring craft.  He continued boxing until 1942, obtaining bouts with boxing standouts Lou Ambers, Sammy Angott, and George Latka, but never again went for a title.

Arizmendi faced Lou Ambers on February 24, 1939, losing in an eleventh round technical knockout in Madison Square Garden before a disappointing crowd of 8,837.  A physician examining Arizmendi's eyes believed the gashes he had received during the bout were too serious to allow him to continue the bout.  Arizmendi had completed all his previous bouts.  Ambers, hoping to obtain another shot at the title, had fought viciously through the bout.  He had drawn with Ambers on June 7, 1938, at Olympic Auditorium in Los Angeles, California.  In one of his best performances against a reigning champion, one reporter gave four rounds to Ambers, as many as four to Arizmendi, and three even. Overcoming a 1-3 odds deficit, Arizmendi may have nearly dropped Ambers in the second with a right cross.   

After retiring from boxing, Arizmendi served in the U.S. Navy during World War II, and later operated restaurants in the Echo Park District of Los Angeles. He was hospitalized in July, 1956, following a partial paralytic condition on his left side. According to his wife, Henrietta, he had been in poor health and lost fifty pounds the previous month.

Death
After a prolonged illness, Arizmendi died of natural causes in the Veterans Administration Hospital in Sawtelle, California, now part of the Los Angeles suburb Westwood, on New Year's Eve 1962, at the age of 48.  He was survived by his wife Henrietta and an illegitimate son Raul Robert Arizmendi, born February, 1933 in Los Angeles. Arizmendi was inducted into the International Boxing Hall of Fame in 2004.

Professional boxing record
All information in this section is derived from BoxRec, unless otherwise stated.

Official Record

All newspaper decisions are officially regarded as “no decision” bouts and are not counted to the win/loss/draw column.

Unofficial record

Record with the inclusion of newspaper decisions to the win/loss/draw column.

References

1914 births
1963 deaths
Boxers from Coahuila
World featherweight boxing champions
Featherweight boxers
Sportspeople from Torreón
International Boxing Hall of Fame inductees
Mexican male boxers
Mexican emigrants to the United States